Martika's Kitchen is the second (and final) studio album by pop singer and former child actor Martika, released in 1991 on Columbia Records. The album was reissued in deluxe 2CD edition in 2018 as Martika's Kitchen (Reheated Edition) with 12 bonus tracks of rare mixes and single edits.

Album background
The album was a departure in musical styles from Martika's debut album. Martika's Kitchen incorporates elements of gospel, jazz, funk, R&B and traditional Cuban music. The album features four songs written and produced by Prince. The four Prince songs (tracks 1-3 and 10) on the album were recorded by him and then sent to Martika to overdub. Three of those songs were based on a lyrics notebook she had given him for inspiration.

Album reception
The title track cracked the US Billboard Hot 100 and the Prince-penned gospel song "Love... Thy Will Be Done" made the top 10.

The album was certified gold in both the UK and Australia. "Love... Thy Will Be Done" reached #1 in Australia, and the top 10 in the UK, Ireland, and New Zealand.  The "Martika's Kitchen" single reached the top 40 in the UK, Ireland, Germany, Australia, and New Zealand.  A third single, "Coloured Kisses", narrowly missed the top 40 in the UK, and peaked at #39 in Australia.  A fourth single, "Safe In the Arms of Love", was released in Europe in 1992 but failed to chart.  "Temptation" was set to become the final single but was never officially released.

A concert tour to promote the album visited over 200 cities.

Track listing
 "Martika's Kitchen" (Prince) – 5:09
 "Spirit" (Frankie Blue, Martika, Prince, Levi Seacer Jr.) – 4:38
 "Love... Thy Will Be Done" (Martika, Prince) – 5:02
 "A Magical Place" (Christopher Max) – 4:41
 "Coloured Kisses" (Blue, Les Pierce, Martika) – 4:37
 "Safe in the Arms of Love" (Michael Cruz, Martika, Michael Jay) – 5:09
 "Pride and Prejudice" (Cruz, Martika) – 5:12
 "Take Me to Forever" (Martika, Jay) – 4:35
 "Temptation" (Blue, Pierce, Martika) – 4:46
 "Don't Say U Love Me" (Martika, Prince) – 4:24
 "Broken Heart" (Blue, Pierce, Martika) – 4:33
 "Mi Tierra" (duet with Celia Cruz) (Blue, Pierce, Martika) – 4:38

Reheated edition - bonus disc 
 "Love... Thy Will Be Done" (Single Version) – 4:23
 "Martika's Kitchen" (Single Version) – 4:12
 "Coloured Kisses" (Single Version) – 4:07
 "Safe in the Arms of Love" (Edit version) – 3:19
 "Spirit" (Radio Edit) – 3:55
 "Love... Thy Will Be Done" (Prince Mix) – 5:57
 "Martika's Kitchen" (Remix 1 Alt. 7" Video Version) – 5:00
 "Coloured Kisses" (Remix) – 4:57
 "Spirit" (House Mix) – 8:03
 "Martika's Kitchen" (Extended Version) – 5:24
 "Spirit" (Hip-Hop Mix) – 5:01
 "Martika's Kitchen" (Alternate Dub Version) – 5:09

Singles
 1991: "Love... Thy Will Be Done" #10 US, #9 UK, #1 AUS
 1991: "Martika's Kitchen" #93 US, #17 UK, #29 AUS
 1992: "Coloured Kisses" #41 UK, #39 AUS
 1993: "Safe in the Arms of Love"
 1993: "Spirit" (remixes promo only)
 1993: "Mi Tierra/El Amor Llegará" (Argentine promo only)

Other tracks
 "El Amor Llegará" ("Love... Thy Will Be Done") – 5:01
 Released in Argentina with "Mi Tierra" as a double A-side promo single.

 "Beautiful Fabulous" (outtake)
 "Rub U Down" (outtake)
 "The Do" (outtake)

Chart performance

Sales and certifications

References

Martika albums
1991 albums
Albums produced by Prince (musician)
Columbia Records albums